Staincross is a village in South Yorkshire, England, on the border with West Yorkshire. Historically part of the West Riding of Yorkshire, it formed part of the defunct Barnsley West and Penistone borough constituency, following the Boundary Commission for England's report on South Yorkshire's Parliamentary constituencies in 2004 and the subsequent inquiry in 2005, it is now part of the Barnsley Central borough constituency. The population now falls within the Darton East ward of the Metropolitan Borough of Barnsley. The village also gave its name to the Staincross wapentake in the West Riding of Yorkshire.

Geography
Staincross lies off the A61 road, about three miles north-west of Barnsley. The section of the A61 between Staincross and Newmillerdam is rated in the top three most dangerous roads in Britain according to a survey conducted by The AA Motoring Trust.

History
The name is believed to be derived from a Saxon stone cross ('stane cross') that until the 18th century occupied a position on the junction of Staincross Common - which in itself is an ancient trackway - and Greenside. The stone, now lost, may have been the remains of a rural shrine.
Alternatively, those remains may have been from a typical wapentake meeting cross, now partially reconstructed in Cawthorne parish church grounds a short distance from Ailric's local power base.

Postal recognition
After a prolonged campaign (backed by former Test cricket umpire, Dickie Bird, a resident of Staincross), a ballot was held in January 2003 to determine whether the residents of Staincross wanted their mail to include the name of the village. Before the ballot, Staincross mail bore the name of a neighbouring village, either Mapplewell or Darton. Indeed, it is unclear where the boundaries between the three villages lie. Villagers voted overwhelmingly in favour of the proposal by 966 to 199 and Royal Mail implemented changes to officially recognise the village.

References

External links

 Staincross Working Men's Club
 Staincross Parish Church
 Staincross Methodist Church

Villages in South Yorkshire
Geography of the Metropolitan Borough of Barnsley